The Lü Clan Disturbance (180 BCE) refers to a political upheaval after the death of Empress Lü Zhi of the Han dynasty. In the aftermath, her clan, the Lü, were deposed from their seats of power and massacred, Emperor Houshao was deposed and Emperor Wen acceded the throne.

The term also sometimes refers to the total domination of the political scene by Empress Lü Zhi after the death of her son Emperor Hui.

Emperor Gaozu's death and Empress Lü Zhi in power
When Ying Bu rebelled in August or September 196 BCE, Emperor Gaozu personally led the troops against Ying and received an arrow wound which allegedly led to his death the following year. His heir apparent Liu Ying took the throne and is posthumously known as Emperor Hui of Han (r. 195–188 BCE). Shortly afterwards Gaozu's widow Lü Zhi, now empress dowager, had Liu Ruyi, a potential claimant to the throne, poisoned and his mother, Lady Qi, brutally mutilated. When the teenage Emperor Hui discovered the cruel acts committed by his mother, Loewe says that he "did not dare disobey her." From that point, Emperor Hui only "indulged himself with wine and women" and no longer made key governing decisions, leaving them to his mother.

Emperor Hui's death and Empress Lü Zhi seizes control

When Emperor Hui died in autumn 188 BCE, his son (noting that this parentage is disputed) ascended to the throne as Emperor Qianshao. However, there was no pretension that he was actually in charge; Emperor Hui's mother Empress Lü Zhi, titled "Empress Dowager Lü" (never "Grand Empress Dowager"), kept the control of the imperial court. From then on it didn't matter who was the emperor, Empress Dowager Lü acted as regent, she was the one who exercised the power of the emperor and decided even who was the emperor, history mentions it as "presiding over court and issuing edicts" (lin chao chengzhi 临朝称制).

In winter 188 BCE, Empress Dowager Lü wanted to make her brothers princes despite her husband Emperor Gaozu's ruling that only members of the imperial Liu clan could be made princes – a ruling that Empress Dowager Lü had a hand in creating. She was opposed by Right Minister Wang Ling (王陵) but was supported by Left Minister Chen Ping and the commander-in-chief of the armed forces, Zhou Bo. When Wang rebuked Chen and Zhou in private for going against Gaozu's ruling, they explained that their compliance with Empress Dowager Lü's position was necessary to protect the empire and the Liu family.

Empress Dowager Lü then promoted Wang to the honorary position of the emperor's teacher (太傅, taifu); Wang declined, claiming illness. Lü removed him from his position as Right Minister and had him (as Marquess of Anguo) returned to his march (in modern Baoding, Hebei) and promoted Chen to Right Minister ("right" being the more honoured direction) and her lover Shen Yiji (審食其), Marquess of Piyang, to Left Minister.

Empress Dowager Lü then went ahead and carried out her plan to make members of her clan princes. In summer 187 BCE, after her daughter, Princess Yuan of Lu died, she made the princess's son, Zhang Yan (張偃), Prince of Lu. Princess Yuan of Lu's husband and Zhang Yan's father, Zhang Ao (張敖), had, during Gaozu's reign, been Prince of Zhao, but was removed as part of the policy against non-Liu princes, so Empress Dowager Lü might have felt that making Zhang Yan a prince would be considered to be more justified; when Zhang Ao died in 182 BCE, he was posthumously honoured as a prince.

A month later, she required the emperor's officials to formally petition her to make her nephew Lü Tai (呂台) Prince of Lü – carving the principality out from the Principality of Qi. Also, in the unprecedented and subsequently rare action of granting a female a march, in 184 BCE, she made her younger sister Lü Xu (呂須) Marchioness of Lingguang. In spring 181 BCE, Lü Tai's son Lü Chan (呂產), who had become Prince of Lü after his father's death, was given the larger Principality of Liang, but did not go to his principality but stayed in the capital Chang'an to serve as the emperor's teacher and assistant to Empress Dowager Lü. Later that year, the empress dowager made her nephew Lü Lu (呂祿) Prince of Zhao and another son of Lü Tai's, Lü Tong (呂通), Prince of Yan.

Death of Empress Dowager Lü
In the summer of 180 BCE, Empress Dowager Lü died. Immediately before her death, she had put Lü Lu and Lü Chan in charge of the imperial guards – Lü Lu in charge of the stronger northern division and Lü Chan in charge of the weaker southern division – and also the government. After her death, it was alleged that the Lü clan had a plan to overthrow the Han dynasty and assume imperial power themselves. Purportedly, this plan was leaked to Liu Zhang, the Marquess of Zhuxu and grandson of Emperor Gao through his oldest son Liu Fei (劉肥), who had married a daughter of Lü Lu and who had learned of the plan from his wife. Liu Zhang then planned a rebellion with his younger brother Liu Xingju, the Marquess of Dongmou, and their older brother Liu Xiang, the Prince of Qi. Under their plan, Liu Xiang would lead Qi forces against the capital, while Liu Zhang and Liu Xingju would persuade the imperial guards to rise up against the Lüs. If they were successful, they planned to have Liu Xiang declared emperor.

Coup d'état against the Lüs and their total destruction
However, everything did not go to plan. In autumn 180 BCE, Liu Xiang did indeed start a military campaign with his own forces and also gained the support of the nearby Principality of Langye. Lü Chan sent Guan Ying (灌嬰), the Marquess of Yingyin, against the Qi forces, but Guan, unwilling to fight the Qi forces (because he actually distrusted the Lüs more than Qi), managed to negotiate a secret armistice with Liu Xiang, and both armies halted some distance apart from each other.

Allegedly, at this time, the Lüs were ready to take over the imperial dynasty, but did not do so because they were concerned at the reactions of Zhou Bo, Liu Zhang, and the principalities of Qi and Chu. While the crisis was forming in Xi'an, so was a new conspiracy, involving:

 Liu Zhang
 Liu Xingju
 Zhou Bo (who, despite his title as commander of the armed forces, did not actually have control of the armed forces in the capital)
 Chen Ping (who, also despite his title as prime minister, did not have actual control of the government machinery)
 Guan Ying
 Cao Qu (曹窟), the Marquess of Pingyang and son of Cao Can (曹參), a former prime minister
 Li Ji (酈寄), the son of Li Shang, the Marquess of Quzhou and the best friend of Lü Lu
 Ji Tong (紀通), the Marquess of Xiangping
 Liu Jie (劉揭), the Minister of Vassal Affairs.

The conspirators first tried to get the Lüs to give up power voluntarily, by having Li Ji persuade Lü Lu that the best course of action for him and Lü Chan was to return to their principalities and turn over power to Zhou and Chen. Lü Lu agreed, but was unable to reach a consensus with the Lü clan elders.

The conspirators then took drastic actions. Ji issued a forged imperial edict, ordering the northern division of the imperial guards to be turned over to Zhou. When the edict arrived at the northern division's camp, Li and Liu Jie persuaded Lü Lu that the edict was genuine and that he should obey it, and he did so. Zhou then, after requiring the guards to affirm their loyalty to the imperial Liu clan, took over the northern division.

The conspirators then took action against Lü Chan, who had not known of this turn in events. While Lü Chan was trying to enter the imperial palace (alleged by the conspirators later to be preparing for the takeover), Liu Zhang and Cao took control of the gates of the palace and had Lü Chan and his guards trapped in the courtyard. Zhou sent some soldiers to Liu Zhang, who fought with Lü Chan's guards and killed him in battle. Over the next few days, the Lü clan was slaughtered to the last person.

Emperor Wen's accession to the throne
The conspirators argued that their actions were justified in order to protect Emperor Houshao against the Lü conspiracy, but once the Lüs were killed, they alleged that neither the emperor nor his brothers were in fact Emperor Hui's sons.  Rather, they suggested that Empress Zhang Yan, Emperor Hui's wife, had stolen and adopted the boys at Empress Dowager Lü's instigation. They also admitted that they were concerned about reprisals when Emperor Houshao and his brothers grew up. They then agreed to depose Emperor Houshao and invite an imperial prince, not from Emperor Hui's line, to be the new emperor.

As to which prince to choose to be the new emperor, some of the conspirators suggested that Liu Xiang, being the eldest Di son (嫡長子) of Emperor Gao's oldest son (thus the eldest grandson of Emperor Gao), was the obvious choice. However, most of the important officials disagreed with this suggestion. They were concerned that Liu Xiang's uncle Si Jun (駟均) was a dominating figure and that, if Liu Xiang were to become emperor, they would have a repeat of the Lü clan situation. They believed that Emperor Gao's oldest surviving son, 23-year-old Prince Liu Heng of Dai, was the better choice, because he was known to be filial and tolerant, and because his mother Consort Bo 's family was known to be careful and kind. They then secretly sent messengers to Prince Heng, inviting him to be the new emperor.

In response to the invitation, Prince Heng's advisors were suspicious. Apparently they felt that the massacre of the Lü clan was unjustified, and were concerned that the officials in fact had intended on making Prince Heng a puppet and were ready to take real power themselves. However, one of Prince Heng's advisors, Song Chang (宋昌), had a different opinion. He believed that the people were supportive of the Han dynasty and would not tolerate a takeover; and that given that there were many other principalities outside the capital, that the officials, even if they had wanted to, would be unable to usurp imperial power. Still uncertain, Prince Heng sent his uncle Bo Zhao (薄昭) to Xi'an to meet with Zhou, who guaranteed that the officials were sincere in their invitation and had no ulterior motive. Bo believed them and urged Prince Heng to accept the offer.

Prince Heng then headed to Chang'an. During an evening ceremony at the Dai mission in the capital, the officials, led by Chen, offered the throne to Prince Heng, and he accepted, formally ascending the throne after declining four times, as Emperor Wen. That same night, Liu Xingju evicted Emperor Houshao from the imperial palace, and the officials welcomed Emperor Wen to the palace with great pomp.

Implications 
Overall, the Lü Clan Disturbance had positive effects for the Han dynasty. It was affirmed that the power would rest with the emperor. Further, and more importantly, Emperor Wen became an effective, thrifty, hard-working and benevolent ruler, and the reigns of Emperor Wen and his son Emperor Jing were generally regarded as one of the golden ages of Chinese history. What happened to the Lü clan has often been used throughout Chinese history as a warning to the families of empresses not to assume too much power, and to emperors not to allow them to do so.

180 BC
Han dynasty
Wars of succession involving the states and peoples of Asia